Julio Teodoro Salem Gallegos (26 September 1900 – 3 September 1968) was an Ecuadorian politician of Lebanese background. He was born in Riobamba. Salem was a member of Liberal Radical Party and was elected to the Congress is 1934. He also served as minister of public works. Salem was Head of State of Ecuador from 29 May 1944 to 31 May 1944 after Carlos Arroyo del Río was deposed.

References

1900 births
1968 deaths
Presidents of Ecuador
Ecuadorian people of Lebanese descent
Ecuadorian Radical Liberal Party politicians
Government ministers of Ecuador
Members of the National Congress (Ecuador)